Twitter verification is a system intended to communicate the authenticity of a Twitter account. When introduced in June 2009, the system provided the site's readers with a means to distinguish genuine notable account holders, such as celebrities and organizations, from impostors or parodies. Until November 2022, a blue checkmark (UK: blue tick) displayed against an account name indicated that Twitter had taken steps to ensure that the account was actually owned by the person or organization whom it claimed to represent. The checkmark does not imply endorsement from Twitter, and does not mean that tweets from a verified account are necessarily accurate or truthful in any way. People with verified accounts on Twitter are often colloquially referred to as "blue checks" on social media and by reporters.

Since November 2022, Twitter users with an active Twitter Blue subscription may also display the blue "verified" checkmark. Twitter users who had been verified through the previous system are known as "legacy verified" accounts. In December 2022, Twitter introduced additional gold and gray checkmarks, used by businesses and government-affiliated accounts, respectively.

History

2009–2022 
In June 2009, after being criticized by Kanye West and sued by Tony La Russa over unauthorized accounts run by impersonators, the company launched their "Verified Accounts" program. Twitter stated that an account with a "blue tick" verification badge indicates "we've been in contact with the person or entity the account is representing and verified that it is approved". After the beta period, the company stated in their FAQ that it "proactively verifies accounts on an ongoing basis to make it easier for users to find who they're looking for" and that they "do not accept requests for verification from the general public".
Originally, Twitter took on the responsibility of reaching out to celebrities and other notable to confirm their identities in order to establish a verified account. 

In July 2016, Twitter announced a public application process to grant verified status to an account "if it is determined to be of public interest" and that verification "does not imply an endorsement".  In 2016 the company began accepting requests for verification, but it was discontinued the same year. Twitter explained that the volume of requests for verified accounts had exceeded its ability to cope; rather, Twitter determines on its own whom to approach about verified accounts, limiting verification to accounts which are "authentic, notable, and active".

In November 2020, Twitter announced a relaunch of its verification system in 2021. According to the new policy, Twitter verifies six different types of accounts; for three of them (companies, brands, and influential individuals like activists), the existence of a Wikipedia page will be one criterion for showing that the account has "Off Twitter Notability".

Controversy 
Twitter's practice and process for verifying accounts came under scrutiny in 2017 after the company verified the account of white supremacist and far-right political activist, Jason Kessler. Many who criticized Twitter's decision to verify Kessler's account saw this as a political act on the company's behalf. In response, Twitter put its verification process on hold. The company tweeted, "Verification was meant to authenticate identity & voice but it is interpreted as an endorsement or an indicator of importance. We recognize that we have created this confusion and need to resolve it. We have paused all general verifications while we work and will report back soon."

As of November 2017, Twitter continued to deny verification of Julian Assange's account following his requests.

In November 2019, Dalit activists of India alleged that higher-caste people get Twitter verification easily and trended hashtags #CancelAllBlueTicksInIndia and #CasteistTwitter. Critics have said that the company's verification process is not transparent and causes digital marginalisation of already marginalised communities. Twitter India rejected the allegations, calling them "impartial" and working on a "case-by-case" policy.

After three years without offering the account verification service, on May 20, 2021, Twitter relaunched its service that attests to user legitimacy. This time offering notability criteria for the account categories of government, companies, brands, and organizations, news organizations and journalists, entertainment, sports and activists, organizers, and other influential individuals. Among all these categories listed, it is still missing a specific category that fits scientists and religious figures.

Since November 2022

Following the acquisition of Twitter by Elon Musk on October 28, 2022, Musk told Twitter employees to introduce paid verification by November 7 through Twitter Blue. The Verge reported that the updated Blue subscription would cost $19.99 per month, and users would lose their verification status if they did not join within 90 days. Following backlash, Musk tweeted, in response to author Stephen King, a lowered $8 price on November 1, 2022. Twitter confirmed the new price of $7.99 per month on November 5, 2022. The new verification system began rollout on November 9, 2022, a day after the 2022 United States elections. The decision to delay its rollout was to address concerns about users potentially spreading misinformation about voting results by posing as news outlets and lawmakers.

At the same time, Twitter introduced a secondary gray "Official" label on some high-profile accounts, but removed them hours after launch. Less than 48 hours later, Twitter reinstated the gray "Official" label, after multiple users were suspended for deliberately impersonating reporters and high-profile athletes like LeBron James. A viral tweet from an account purporting to be the pharmaceutical company Eli Lilly and Company caused the company's stock to fall after announcing "insulin is free now." As a result, Twitter disabled new Blue subscriptions on November 11, 2022.

On December 12, 2022, Twitter Blue was relaunched again with some changes, including an increased price of $11 for users who sign up through iOS devices to compensate for the 30% cut imposed by Apple. Twitter stated that only Twitter accounts older than 90 days and with a confirmed phone number are able to subscribe and Blue checkmarks are issued once Twitter reviews the account, and any changes to the profile "will result in the loss of the blue checkmark" until Twitter can review the account again. The "Official" labels were replaced with "gold" checkmarks for official businesses, which was reported to have a monthly fee of $1,000, and later, grey checkmarks for government accounts on Twitter. Accounts that had been verified through the previous system were renamed to "legacy verified", with Musk calling the previous system "corrupt and nonsensical" in a tweet, and stating the blue checkmarks on those accounts would be removed "in a few months". Musk claimed that the impersonation issue was resolved by manually reviewing all applications, but The Washington Post tech columnist Geoffrey A. Fowler was able to create an impersonation account of senator Ed Markey, which was promptly verified after subscribing to Twitter Blue and only suspended the account after Fowler's story was published.

Significance and social impact 
A verified account is a highly sought-after qualification among Twitter users. Since Twitter alone can grant blue check marks, they can use them as a passive inducement for users to create more content. Alison Hearn argued in 2017 that they introduce a new social class of Twitter users. This can cause tension between verified and non-verified users of the site; when Twitter temporarily locked out verified accounts in the aftermath of the 2020 Twitter account hijacking, many non-verified users celebrated. After the blue checkmark was made available as a paid subscription in 2022, reporters noted trolls spreading demonstrably false conspiracy theories about COVID-19 vaccines using the checkmark to feign credibility.

References

Notes

External links 
 Twitter Support — About Verified Accounts
 Twitter Support — Verification FAQ

Twitter
Social media
Identity management
Computer access control
Internet culture